Jonathan Eysseric and Romain Jouan were the defending champions, but chose not to compete.
Rubén Ramírez Hidalgo and Santiago Ventura won the title, defeating Brian Battistone and Andreas Siljeström 6–4, 7–6(3) in the final.

Seeds

Draw

Draw

References
 Main Draw

Doubles